Julio Preciado is a banda singer based in Mazatlán, Sinaloa, Mexico. His music is based on norteño songs, such as those of Los Cadetes de Linares, and sometimes includes accordions in addition to brass instrumentation.  Preciado was a member of Banda El Recodo. He has been on a Mexican singing show called Cantando Por Un Sueño. As well as, singing with a mariachi band on the 2001 album Entre Amigos.

See also 
 La Banda el Recodo
 El Coyote

References 

Mexican musicians
Mexican male singers
Banda musicians
Singers from Sinaloa
People from Mazatlán
Living people
Year of birth missing (living people)